WJCR may refer to:

 WJCR, a shortwave radio station licensed to Millerstown, Kentucky, United States
 WJCR-FM, a radio station (90.1 FM) licensed to Upton, Kentucky, United States
 WJCR-LP, a low-power radio station (94.7 FM) licensed to Jasper, Tennessee, United States
 WNJR (FM), a college radio station (91.7 FM) formerly known as WJCR